Zumbun (also rendered Jimbin, Jimbinawa) is an Afro-Asiatic language spoken in Bauchi State, Nigeria, in Jimbim settlement, Darazo LGA.

References 

Languages of Nigeria
West Chadic languages